The 2022–23 Princeton Tigers men's basketball team represents Princeton University in the 2022–23 NCAA Division I men's basketball season. The Tigers, led by 11th-year head coach Mitch Henderson, play their home games at Jadwin Gymnasium in Princeton, New Jersey as members of the Ivy League.

The Tigers defeated No. 2 seed Arizona to become the eleventh No. 15 seed to upset a No. 2 seed in the Tournament's history. They then defeated No. 7 seed Missouri to become the fourth No. 15 seed to advance to the Sweet Sixteen, making it three consecutive years a No. 15 seed has accomplished the feat.

Previous season
The Tigers finished the 2021–22 season 23–7, 12–2 in Ivy League play to finish as Ivy League regular season champions. They defeated Cornell in the semifinals of the Ivy League tournament before losing to Yale in the championship game. As a regular season champion who failed to win their conference tournament, the Tigers received an automatic bid to the National Invitation Tournament. There they lost to VCU in the first round.

Roster

Schedule and results

|-
!colspan=12 style=""| Non-conference regular season

|-
!colspan=12 style=""| Ivy League regular season

|-
!colspan=12 style=| Ivy League Tournament

|-
!colspan=12 style=}| NCAA tournament

Sources

References

Princeton Tigers men's basketball seasons
Princeton
Princeton
Princeton Tigers men's basketball
Princeton Tigers men's basketball